Caimh McDonnell is an Irish novelist. Born in Limerick and raised in Dublin, McDonnell is a former stand-up comedian and TV writer. McDonnell primarily writes comic crime thrillers. 

His Stranger Times series, which melds urban fantasy, paranormal, and humour with crime, is written under the pen name of C.K McDonnell. 

McDonnell has written fourteen novels while his TV writing credits include Have I Got News for You, Mock the Week, A League of Their Own, The Sarah Millican Television Programme, and the children's CBBC animated series Pet Squad which he created.

A Man With One of Those Faces, his debut novel, was nominated for best novel at the 2017 CAP awards.

His novel I Have Sinned was shortlisted for the Kindle Storyteller Award in 2019.

Novels

The Dublin Trilogy 

 A Man With One of Those Faces (2016)
 The Day That Never Comes (2017)
 Angels in the Moonlight (2017) (prequel)
 Last Orders (2018)
 Dead Man's Sins (2021)
 Firewater Blues (2022)
 The Family Jewels  (2022)

McGarry Stateside Series 

 Disaster Inc (2018)
 I Have Sinned (2019)
 The Quiet Man (2020)

MCM Investigations Series 

 The Final Game (2020)
 Deccie Must Die (2022)

The Stranger Times (as C.K McDonnell) 

 The Stranger Times (2021)
This Charming Man (2022)
Love Will Tear Us Apart (2023)

 Stand-alone Novels 

 Welcome to Nowhere (2020)

 Short Story Collections 

 How to Send a Message (2019)
 Things that Fell from the Sky (2020 as C.K. McDonnell)
 In Other News (2020 as C.K.McDonnell)

 Short Story Podcasts 

 The Bunnycast (2018-Present)
 The Stranger Times'' (2020-Present)

References

External links
WhiteHairedIrishman.com - Official Caimh McDonnell's website
 profilecritics.com - Interview with Profile

Living people
Year of birth missing (living people)
21st-century Irish novelists
Irish male novelists